Max Giesinger (born 3 October 1988) is a German singer-songwriter and musician. He first gained widespread popularity with his single "80 Millionen", placing as high as second position in the German charts. His music is usually labeled as pop and pop-rock.

Early life 
Giesinger was born and raised in Waldbronn, Baden-Württemberg. At the age of 13, he played in his first band the Deadly Punks. At the age of 20, he played in the bands Bud Spencer Group, Sovereign Point and as solo project Maxville, and completed 70 performances per year. He completed his high school diploma at the Gymnasium Karlsbad. After graduating from high school, he travelled to Australia and New Zealand where he worked as a street musician for a work & travel program.

Career 
Following his return to Germany, Giesinger applied to the Baden-Württemberg Pop Academy in Mannheim but was not admitted as a student because he did not pass the entrance examination. He participated in the singing casting show The Voice of Germany in 2011 after being approached by the producers. With the help of his coach Xavier Naidoo, he reached the final of the show on 10 February 2012, in which he finished fourth. His song "Dach der Welt" reached 14th place on the German charts. This was followed by a tour of Germany with performances in twelve cities. In 2013, Giesinger published his EP Unser Sommer and then went on his second tour of Germany.

After separating himself from his label for personal differences, Giesinger launched a crowdfunding campaign in February 2014 to finance his first album. He reached the financing goal within 24 hours. His debut album Laufen lernen was published by Giesinger himself with the help of Rent a Record Company. However, he failed to build on the success of his time at The Voice of Germany.

In April 2016, Giesinger released his second album, Der Junge, der rennt, managing to win label rights with BMG. In addition, the pre-released single "80 Millionen" developed into a radio success and rose into the German charts in April 2016. Two weeks later, the album reached 20th place in the charts in Germany and also rose to the Swiss charts. He recorded a new version of "80 Millionen" for the UEFA Euro 2016, which quickly rose and finished second in the German charts. On 16 September 2016, Giesinger released a second single "Wenn sie tanzt" which reached the top 10 of the German singles chart.

Discography

Studio albums

Singles

Awards 
 2016: Goldenne Henne 2016 for Newcomer of the Year
 2016: MTV Europe Music Awards for Best German Act
 2017: Radio Rogenbogen Awards for the Best Newcomer of 2016

References

External links

 Official website

1988 births
21st-century German male singers
German singer-songwriters
German pop singers
People from Karlsruhe (district)
Living people
The Voice of Germany